Together Again! is an album by saxophonist Willis Jackson with organist Jack McDuff which was recorded in 1959 and 1960 and released on the Prestige label in 1965.

Reception

AllMusic reviewer Richie Unterberger stated: "the Willis Jackson-Jack McDuff-speared combo offers respectable early soul-jazz, if not too different from many other Prestige-overseen sessions of the early '60s".

Track listing
All compositions by Willis Jackson, except where noted.
 "Three Little Words" (Bert Kalmar, Harry Ruby) – 5:01
 "Tu'gether" – 7:10
 "Glad'a See Ya" – 4:12
 "This'll Get to Ya" – 10:14
 "It Might as Well Be Spring" (Oscar Hammerstein II, Richard Rodgers) – 6:58
Recorded at Van Gelder Studio in Hackensack, New Jersey on May 25, 1959 (track 1), and at Van Gelder Studio in Englewood Cliffs, New Jersey on November 9, 1959 (track 3), February 26, 1960 (tracks 4, 5) and August 16, 1960 (track 2)

Personnel
Willis Jackson – tenor saxophone
Jack McDuff – organ
Bill Jennings – guitar
Milt Hinton (tracks 4, 5), Wendell Marshall (tracks 2, 3), Tommy Potter (track 1) – bass
Bill Elliot (track 2), Alvin Johnson (tracks 1, 3–5) – drums
Buck Clarke – congas (tracks 4, 5)

References

Willis Jackson (saxophonist) albums
Jack McDuff albums
1965 albums
Prestige Records albums
Albums recorded at Van Gelder Studio
Albums produced by Esmond Edwards